Chay Cooper (born 17 November 2001) is an English professional footballer who plays as a midfielder for  club Colchester United.

Career
Cooper began playing for signed for Southend United at the age of 10. Towards the end of the 2016–17 season, he joined Tottenham Hotspur from Southend as a scholar. He was loaned back to Southend to play in their Under-23 team to get some game time in October 2020.

At the end of the 2020–21 season, Cooper was released by Tottenham. After featuring in a number of pre-season friendlies for Colchester United's Under-23 side, he signed a deal with the club on 3 September 2021.

On 28 September 2021, Cooper made his first-team debut for Colchester, starting in their 1–0 EFL Trophy victory against West Ham United Under-21s. In Cooper's football league debut he came off the bench to score the second goal away at Hartlepool which Colchester won 2–0.

Career statistics

References

External links
 Soccerway profile

Living people
2001 births
English footballers
Sportspeople from Harlow
Association football midfielders
Southend United F.C. players
Tottenham Hotspur F.C. players
Colchester United F.C. players